The 2010 Arkansas–Pine Bluff Golden Lions football team represented the University of Arkansas at Pine Bluff in the 2010 NCAA Division I FCS football season as member of the West Division of the Southwestern Athletic Conference (SWAC). The Golden Lions were led by third year head coach Monte Coleman and played their home games at Golden Lion Stadium. They finished the season with an overall record of 5–6.

Schedule

References

Arkansas-Pine Bluff
Arkansas–Pine Bluff Golden Lions football seasons
Gold